ScanWind was a Norwegian manufacturing company that produced wind turbines. In  2009 Scanwind was bought by General Electric, and became the base for GE Wind Energy in Norway. The company has its head office in Trondheim and production facilities in Verdal, both Norway, as well as engineering division in Karlstad, Sweden. The company was founded in 1999.

The two models produced by ScanWind are ScanWind 3000 DL with an output of 3.0 MW and ScanWind 3500 DL at 3.5 MW. These windmills have been installed in the Hundhammerfjellet wind farm in Nærøy, owned by NTE.

'

Manufacturing companies of Norway
Norwegian companies established in 1999
Defunct wind turbine manufacturers
Defunct companies of Norway